Michael Haydn's Symphony No. 31 in F major, Perger 22, Sherman 31, MH 405, was written in Salzburg in 1785.

Scored for 2 oboes, 2 English horns, 2 bassoons, 2 horns, and strings, in three movements:

Allegro assai
Andante cantabile, in B-flat major
Presto

Discography

On the CPO label, this symphony is available on a CD that also includes Symphonies Nos. 21, 30 and 32; Johannes Goritzki conducting the Deutsche Kammerakademie Neuss.

References
 A. Delarte, "A Quick Overview Of The Instrumental Music Of Michael Haydn" Bob's Poetry Magazine November 2006: 26 - 27  PDF
 Charles H. Sherman and T. Donley Thomas, Johann Michael Haydn (1737 - 1806), a chronological thematic catalogue of his works. Stuyvesant, New York: Pendragon Press (1993)
 C. Sherman, "Johann Michael Haydn" in The Symphony: Salzburg, Part 2 London: Garland Publishing (1982): lxviii

Symphony 31
Compositions in F major
1785 compositions